Alexander Esswein (born 25 March 1990) is a German professional footballer who plays as a winger or forward for SV Sandhausen.

Club career
Esswein made his debut in the 2007–08 season. He appeared in a league match during the season. He came on in the 63rd minute in a 2–1 loss to 1. FC Köln on 17 December 2007.

He then transferred to VfL Wolfsburg and split time between the first and second teams. He made four league appearances during the 2008–09 season and four league appearances and a German Cup appearance in the 2009–10 season. He substantially made more appearances for the reserve team. During the 2008–09 season, he made 21 appearances, and during the 2009–10 season, he scored four goals in 20 appearances. Esswein moved to Dynamo Dresden for the 2010–11 season. During the season, he scored 17 goals in 31 league appearances. This includes two goals against Bayern's reserve team, in a 3–1 win on 11 November 2010; Wehen Wiesbaden, in a 3–0 win, on 5 March 2011; and against SpVgg Unterhaching, in a 4–0 win, on 23 April 2011. He also made two appearances in the promotion playoff. This proved to be Esswein's only season at the club.

He transferred to 1. FC Nürnberg for the 2011–12 season. During the 2011–12 season, he scored four goals in 26 league appearances and a goal in three German Cup appearances. His four league goals came against FC Augsburg, in a 1–0 win, on 27 August 2011; Hertha BSC, in a 2–0 win, on 21 January 2012; Köln, in a 2–1 win, on 18 February 2012; and Werder Bremen, in a 1–0 win, on 25 February 2012. His German Cup goal came in the second round against Erzgebirge Aue in a 2–1 win on 26 October 2011. His goal scoring rate would drop in the subsequent seasons with Nürnberg. He dropped down to three goals in 28 appearances in the 2012–13 season and no goals in five appearances during the 2013–14 season. He also made an appearance in the Regionalliga Bayern for the reserve team during the 2013–14 season.

He moved to Augsburg during the January transfer window and made 13 appearances for Augsburg during the 2013–14 season. He scored a goal in 19 appearances during the 2014–15 season. The goal came against Köln on 6 December 2014 in a 2–1 win. Esswein played in the opening match of the 2015–16 season, in a German Cup match against SV Elversberg, a 3–1 extra time win. He then opened his Bundesliga campaign by playing in the first three matchdays, including the 1–0 loss to Hertha BSC in the league opener on 15 August 2015.

Hertha BSC
On 26 August 2016, Esswein signed for Hertha BSC on a four-year deal. On 24 September, he scored his first goal for Hertha in a 3–3 draw against Eintracht Frankfurt.

VfB Stuttgart
In January 2019 VfB Stuttgart signed Esswein on loan with a contract option for a permanent deal.

SV Sandhausen
On 9 October 2020, Esswein joined SV Sandhausen on a free transfer.

International career
Esswein played for the German U-21 national team. Previously he had already played for the U-17, U-18, U-18, U-19 and U-20 national team. He was part of the German U-17 team that finished in third place in the 2007 U-17 World Cup in South Korea. In this tournament, Esswein scored two goals against Trinidad and Tobago in the group-stage and scored the winning goal in the third place playoff against Ghana two minutes into stoppage time.

Career statistics

Honours
 Bundesliga: 2008–09

References

External links
 
 

1990 births
Living people
People from Worms, Germany
German footballers
Footballers from Rhineland-Palatinate
Germany under-21 international footballers
Germany youth international footballers
Association football forwards
Bundesliga players
2. Bundesliga players
3. Liga players
Regionalliga players
VfL Wolfsburg players
VfL Wolfsburg II players
1. FC Kaiserslautern players
Dynamo Dresden players
FC Augsburg players
1. FC Nürnberg players
1. FC Nürnberg II players
Hertha BSC players
Hertha BSC II players
VfB Stuttgart players
SV Sandhausen players
VfR Frankenthal players